Aeromachus kali is a species of skipper butterfly found in Asia (Sikkim, Assam, Burma, Laos) and Yunnan.

Description

It is found in Sikkim, India.

References

k
Butterflies of Asia
Butterflies described in 1885
Taxa named by Lionel de Nicéville